Lovemore is both a surname and a given name. Notable people with the name include:

Surname:
Annette Lovemore, South African politician, currently Shadow Deputy Minister of Home Affairs
Sean Lovemore (born 1992), New Zealand football (soccer) player
Tayla Lovemore (born 1995), South African swimmer

Given name:
Lovemore Madhuku, Zimbabwean politician and democracy activist
Lovemore Majaivana (born 1954), Zimbabwean musician, Ndebele singer
Lovemore Matombo, the President of the Zimbabwe Congress of Trade Unions (ZCTU)
Lovemore Mokgweetsi (born 1974), Botswana footballer
Lovemore Moyo (born 1965), Zimbabwean politician, Speaker of the House of Assembly of Zimbabwe
Charles Lovemore Mungoshi (born 1947), writer from Zimbabwe
Lovemore N'dou (born 1971), Australian based South African boxer